Haplochromis erythromaculatus is a species of cichlid endemic to Rwanda where it occurs in Lake Bulera, Lake Ruhondo and their feeder rivers. This species can reach a length of  SL.

References

erythromaculatus
Cichlid fish of Africa
Fish of Rwanda
Endemic fauna of Rwanda
Fish described in 1991
Taxonomy articles created by Polbot